One Market Plaza is a complex of three office buildings  at 1 Market Street along the San Francisco Embarcadero. The historic 11-story Southern Pacific Building, also known as "The Landmark", was completed in 1916, and incorporated into the development in 1976 that includes the 43-storey  Spear Tower, and the 27-storey,  Steuart Tower. At over 1.5 billion pounds, the complex is considered the heaviest development in San Francisco.

History
The plaza is first owned by Morgan Stanley Real Estate and Paramount Group. Later in 2007, Paramount Group purchased a half-interest from Morgan Stanley for $720 million. By 2014, Paramount controlled a 51% stake and the rest by Blackstone.

The complex was renovated in 1996 by the architect firm César Pelli & Associates Architects. In Spring 2014 a new renovation began, which was completed in 2016.

After Southern Pacific's merger with Union Pacific, the Landmark building was sold to The Martin Group in 1997 for $50 million, after plans by another developer to convert the building to a hotel fell through. An $88 million renovation brought modern amenities such as air conditioning and hot water to the building. It later hosted the headquarters of Del Monte Foods for ten years on the building's top three floors. In 2018, Google took lease of 300,000 sqft at The Landmark.

Tenants
As of 2017, Google, as the anchor tenant, occupied 321,680 sqft. Others are  Morgan, Lewis & Bockius, Autodesk, Visa Inc. and Capital Research.

Gallery

See also

San Francisco's tallest buildings

References

External links
 
 

Skyscraper office buildings in San Francisco
Market Street (San Francisco)
Buildings and structures completed in 1916
Buildings and structures completed in 1976
Financial District, San Francisco
Welton Becket buildings